A talking drum is an African drum whose pitch can be regulated to mimic human speech.

Talking drum may also refer to:

 "Talking Drum", a song on the album Tin Drum (album) by Japan
 "Talking Drum", a song on the album Exorcising Ghosts by Japan
 "The Talking Drum", a song on the album Larks' Tongues in Aspic by King Crimson

See also
 Drums in communication